A seed library is an institution that lends or shares seed. It is distinguished from a seedbank in that the main purpose is not to store or hold germplasm or seeds against possible destruction, but to disseminate them to the public which preserves the shared plant varieties through propagation and further sharing of seed.

History
The first contemporary seed library was created in 1999 at the Berkeley Ecology Center. It was called the Bay Area Seed Interchange Library (BASIL). The first seed library to be established in a public library was at the Gardiner Public Library in Gardiner, New York and was developed by Ken Greene in 2004. Since then, the number of seed libraries has grown to over 450 across the globe, with most being established in the United States.

Function
Seed libraries usually maintain their collections through donations from members. but may also operate as pure charity operations intent on serving gardeners and farmers. A common attribute of many seed libraries is to preserve agricultural biodiversity by focusing on rare, local, and heirloom seed varieties.

Seed libraries use varied methods for sharing seeds, primarily by:
 seed swaps otherwise known as seed exchanges, in which library members or the public meet and exchange seeds
 seed "lending," in which people check out seed from the library's collection, grow them, save the seed, and return seed from the propagated plants to the library

Seed libraries may function as programs of public libraries, such as the programs of the Richmond Public Library in California (the "Richmond Grows" program is the "unofficial spiritual center of the [public library seed library] movement") and the New Port Richey Public Library (Florida). Seed library initiatives in public libraries garner patron participation as a novelty supplement to book check-outs. Seed packets are usually located next to everyday circulated items like books, audiobooks, CDs, and DVDs. Seed libraries in public libraries have been successful because they catch patron hobby curiosities. Public libraries are an appropriate space for seed libraries because they make seeds and plants available to everyone.

They are also located in college libraries, such as Hampshire College's seed library; museums, such as the Hull-House Heirloom Seed Library, a program of the Jane Addams Hull-House Museum. or as membership based online programs like the Hudson Valley Seed Library. Some have developed as programs of botanical gardens, such as that of the VanDusen Botanical Garden, or from gardening associations and research institutes, such as the Heritage Seed Library of Garden Organic. Other seed libraries have evolved from community sustainability or resilience efforts, such as the Bay Area Seed Interchange Library (BASIL) (the United States' oldest seed library, which developed from the Berkeley, California Ecology Center); and still others from the Slow Food movement, such as Grow Gainesville's seed program.

While "lending" is straightforward, "returning" or re-depositing seeds presents a challenge, since the new seeds are not necessarily well-described, and may be inadvertent hybrids. Some libraries, like the Live Oak Public Library in Savannah, Georgia, do not accept returns or unsolicited donations to ensure quality control. Other libraries, like the Live Oak Public Library in, Live Oak, Florida, ask that borrowers return seeds if possible but there is no penalty for not doing so, and they will not accept hybrid or GMO seeds. 

Seed libraries complement the preservationist activities of seedbanks, by collecting local and heirloom varieties that might otherwise be lost, and by collecting new local varieties. In theory, lending and returning seed libraries will also promote local agriculture over time, by growing collections of seeds locally adapted to the region.

See also 
 Heirloom plant
 Library
 Navdanya
 Seed saving

References

Further reading
 A Seed Library Thrives, New York Times
The Seed Library Movement from Roots to Bloom
Sowing Revolution: Seed Libraries Offer Hope for Freedom of Food

External links

Seed Library Network
 Bay Area Seed Interchange Library, Berkeley, California
 Seed Library of Los Angeles, Los Angeles, California 
 Richmond Seed Library, Richmond, California
 BFPL Seed Library, Vermont
 Seed Library of Pima County Public Library, Tucson, AZ
 
 

Seed associations
Biorepositories
Types of library
Plant conservation
Libraries by subject